Jean Paul Bredau (born 27 June 1999) is a German sprinter. He competed in the 4x400 m men's relay at the 2021 Summer Olympics, in which his team was last in the heat, with a time of 3:03.62.

Competition record

References

German male sprinters
Athletes (track and field) at the 2020 Summer Olympics
1999 births
Living people
Olympic athletes of Germany